The 1928 United States Senate election in Montana took place on November 6, 1928. Incumbent United States Senator Burton K. Wheeler, who was first elected to the Senate in 1922, ran for re-election. After successfully defeating several challengers in the Democratic primary, Wheeler advanced to the general election, where he faced Republican nominee Joseph M. Dixon, the former Governor of Montana who had previously served in the United States Senate from 1907 to 1913. Though the election was closer than Wheeler's first election, he still managed to defeat Dixon to win his second term in the Senate.

Democratic primary

Candidates
Burton K. Wheeler, incumbent United States Senator
Sam V. Stewart, former Governor of Montana
Sam W. Teagarden, independent candidate for the United States in 1924

Results

Republican primary

Candidates
Joseph M. Dixon, former Governor of Montana, former United States Senator, former United States Congressman from Montana's at-large congressional district
Charles H. Williams, former State Senator
Charles F. Juttner, 1924 Socialist Party nominee for the United States Senate

Results

General election

Results

References

Montana
1928
1928 Montana elections